Okwudor is a town in Njaba Local Government Area of Imo State, Nigeria. Okwudor shares boundaries with Awo-omamma and Umuaka towns. Situated on the bank of Njaba River, the famous river separates Okwudor from Umuaka.

References

Towns in Imo State